Members of the New South Wales Legislative Assembly who served in the 46th parliament held their seats from 1978 to 1981. They were elected at the 1978 election, and at by-elections. The Speaker was Laurie Kelly.

See also
Second Wran ministry
Third Wran ministry
Results of the 1978 New South Wales state election (Legislative Assembly)
Candidates of the 1978 New South Wales state election

References

 1978 New South Wales state election
 Premier: Neville Wran (Labor) (1976-1986)

Members of New South Wales parliaments by term
20th-century Australian politicians